Tabawan Island or Tabauawan is the highest and largest of a group of heavily wooded islands lying in the southwest quadrant of Darvel Bay (Teluk Lahad Datu), Sabah.  It has dual volcanic peaks, and is 275 metres at its highest point.  On the south side of the island there is a small bay, or inlet, quite deep, at 25 to 35 metres. It is about 7.25 kilometres from Sebatik Island, which lies to the southeast. For decades, the pearl farm of the island has safeguarded nearby waters to keep thieves and trespassers away.

See also
 List of islands of Malaysia

References

External links
 Tabawan Eco Dive
 Tabawan the Pearl Island

Islands of Sabah
Underwater diving sites in Malaysia